Tiwi Cobourg is an interim Australian bioregion located in the Top End of the Northern Territory of Australia. The bioregion is part of the Arnhem Land tropical savanna ecoregion.

Tiwi Cobourg consists of two subregions – Cobourg, which includes the Cobourg Peninsula and Croker Island, and Tiwi, which includes the Tiwi Islands.

See also

 Geography of Australia

References

Arnhem Land
Arnhem Land tropical savanna
Coastline of the Northern Territory
IBRA regions
Cobourg Peninsula
Tiwi Islands